I Wrote a Simple Song is the sixth studio album by American soul musician Billy Preston. Released in November 1971, it was his first album for A&M Records and marked the start of a run of commercial success in the United States that lasted through to the late 1970s. The album includes the hit single "Outa-Space", which won the Grammy Award for Best Pop Instrumental Performance of 1972.  Preston included a live version of the instrumental "The Bus", as part of a medley with the Beatles' "Day Tripper", on his 1974 album Live European Tour.

Recording
I Wrote a Simple Song was Preston's first self-produced album. Preston's friend George Harrison played lead guitar on most of the songs, and supplied dobro accompaniment on the title track. The album continued Preston's inclusion of gospel-themed songs which had started with the 1967 album Club Meeting.

Reception

The instrumental "Outa-Space" won a Grammy Award for Best Pop Instrumental Performance in 1973.

Track listing
All songs by Billy Preston and Joe Greene, except where noted.

Side one
"Should Have Known Better"  – 2:28
"I Wrote a Simple Song"  – 3:28
"John Henry" (Preston, Robert Sam)  – 3:15
"Without a Song" (William Rose, Edward Eliscu, Vincent Youmans)  – 4:57
"The Bus"  – 3:32

Side two
"Outa-Space"  – 4:08
"The Looner Tune" (Preston, Greene, Jesse Kirkland)  – 2:47
"You Done Got Older" (Preston, Bruce Fisher)  – 3:08
"Swing Down Chariot" (traditional; arranged by Preston and Greene)  – 4:13
"God Is Great" – 3:32
"My Country, 'Tis of Thee" (traditional)  – 4:27

Personnel
Billy Preston - vocals, piano, Hammond organ, keyboards
David T. Walker - electric guitar
George Harrison - guitar, dobro
Manuel Kellough - drums
King Errisson - congas, percussion
Rocky Peoples - tenor saxophone
Carlos Garnette - trumpet
Quincy Jones - string and horn arrangements
Clydie King, Douglas Gibbs, Duane Rogers, Eugene Bryant, Jesse Kirkland, Merry Clayton, Myrna Matthews, Patrice Holloway, Sherrell Atwood, Venetta Fields - backing vocals
Technical
Roland Young - art direction
Jim McCrary - photography
Tommy Vicari - engineer

Charts

Singles

External links
 Billy Preston-I Wrote A Simple Song at Discogs

References

1971 albums
Billy Preston albums
A&M Records albums
Albums arranged by Quincy Jones
Albums conducted by Quincy Jones
Albums produced by Billy Preston
Albums recorded at A&M Studios